Gompholobium villosum is a species of flowering plant in the pea family Fabaceae and is endemic to the south-west of Western Australia. It is a slender, erect shrub with simple, needle-shaped leaves with one or two grooves on the lower surface, and violet, pink or purple flowers.

Description
Flowering occurs from September to December and the fruit is a cylindrical pod.

Taxonomy
This species of pea was first formally described in 1844 by Carl Meissner, who gave it the name Burtonia villosa in Lehmann's Plantae Preissianae. In 1987 Michael Crisp changed the name to Gompholobium villosum. The specific epithet (villosum) means "with long, soft hairs".

Distribution and habitat
This species of pea grows in swampy areas and on hillsides in the Esperance Plains, Jarrah Forest, Swan Coastal Plain and Warren biogeographic regions of south-western Western Australia.

Conservation status
Gompholobium villosum is classified as "not threatened" by the Government of Western Australia Department of Biodiversity, Conservation and Attractions.

References

Mirbelioids
villosum
Fabales of Australia
Flora of Western Australia
Plants described in 1844
Taxa named by Carl Meissner